The 2009 Indian general election in Karnataka, occurred for 28 seats in the state.

List of elected MPs
Source: Election Commission of India

Results by Party

References

Indian general elections in Karnataka
2000s in Karnataka
Karnataka